Symphanodes is a monotypic genus of Australian ground spiders containing the single species, Symphanodes dianiphus. It was first described by William Joseph Rainbow in 1916, and has only been found in Australia.

References

Gnaphosidae
Monotypic Araneomorphae genera
Spiders of Australia
Taxa named by William Joseph Rainbow